Brailiv is an urban-type settlement in Zhmerynka Raion of Vinnytsia Oblast in Ukraine. It is located on the banks of the Riv, a tributary of the Southern Bug. Brailiv belongs to Zhmerynka urban hromada, one of the hromadas of Ukraine. Population:

Economy

Transportation
Brailiv railway station is not located in the urban-type settlement of Brailiv but in the settlement of Brailiv, a couple of kilometers southwest of the urban-type settlement, on the railway connecting Zhmerynka and Vinnytsia. There is some passenger traffic.

The settlement has access to Highway M21 connecting Vinnytsia and Mohyliv-Podilskyi.

References

Urban-type settlements in Zhmerynka Raion